Peder Nikolai Leier Jacobsen (13 May 1888 – 31 January 1967) is a Norwegian politician for the Labour Party.

He was elected to the Norwegian Parliament from Troms in 1950, and was re-elected on two occasions. He had previously served in the position of deputy representative during the term 1945–1949. He served most of this term as a regular representative, replacing Søren Berg Sørensen Moen who died in May 1946.

Leier Jacobsen was born in Trondenes and a member of the executive committee of Trondenes municipality council in 1922–1925. He then held the same position in Sandtorg, except the periods 1934–1937, 1937–1941, 1945–1947 and 1947–1951 when he served as mayor. He was also a member of Troms county council from 1934 to 1951.

References

1888 births
1967 deaths
Labour Party (Norway) politicians
Members of the Storting
20th-century Norwegian politicians